Karekatte is a village in the Indian state of Karnataka. Karekatte is located on Davanagere-Channagiri connecting road.

History
New Karekatte, a shifted village, and very well planned village, Whole village got shifted in 1974. Karekatte is one of the 61 Gram Panchayats of Channagiri Taluk and belongs to Santhebennur-2 hobli.

Demographics
As of 2001 India census.

Education and business
Karekatte have following schools, up to 10th standard only.

Primary with Upper Primary Schools and High Schools:

Anganwadi Centres (Kindergarten)).: They were started by the Indian government as part of the Integrated Child Development Services program to combat child hunger and malnutrition.

Karekatte has one "Pre-Metric Government Hostel" for boys; it specially serves for poor family children.

Fair Price Shop (Nyaya Bele Angadi):  part of India's Public Distribution System established by Government of India, is a kind of shop in India which is used to distribute rations at a subsidized price to the poor. Locally these are known as "Nyaya Bele Angadi" and chiefly sell wheat, rice, kerosene and sugar at a price lower than the market price. For buying items from this shop one must have a ration card. These shops are operated throughout the country by joint assistance of central and state government.

Ration Card details of Karekatte Panchayat:

Here main occupation is agriculture. Most of the land is irrigated by Bhadhra Right Bank Canal, from Bhadhra Reservoir Project (BRP), near Lakkavalli, Tarikere (Taluk), Chikkamagaluru (District) Mainly Paddy, Sugarcane, Betel nut, Coconut.

Other major business is Milk Production. Karekatte has Milk Producers Co-operative Societies (KMPCS).

COMMUNITY HALL (Dr. B. R. Ambedkar SAMUDAYA BHAVAN  is constructed at Harijan Colony at a cost of Rs.2.00 lakh.
It is constructed Under Special Component Plan for all-round development of Scheduled Castes / Scheduled Tribes.

Postal Branch Office Details:
 

Karekatte has Fully Covered Water Supply' to every household, Developed under the Accelerated Rural Water Supply Programme (ARWSP) was introduced by the Government of India to accelerate the pace of coverage of drinking water supply.

Karekatte don't have any Bank branches, Nearest Banks are:

Places of interest
Mallikarjuna Temple (also known as Mallapana Matti), which is situated on a Hill,
Shanti Sagara (Soolekere)Lake, one of Asia's biggest tanks, built in 1128, the tank has a history of 800 years. It took three years to construct the massive tank. It has a total catchment area of 329.75 square kilometres. It irrigates 1,900 hectares of land and more than 50 villages are benefited by it. Only  from Karekatte. There is a temple dedicated to Lord Siddeshwara near the lake. An aqueduct designed by Sir M Vishweshwariah is also a major tourist attraction. The government is taking steps to spruce up tourist attractions in the area.

Transportation

Road
Karekatte is ~1 km away from main Channagiri - Davanagere connecting road. Only one Bus will pass through Karekatte village in the morning and evening once. There is a frequent bus from Channagiri to davanagere vice versa. So need to get down at Kabbala village, from there common passenger auto-rickshaws are available to karekatte.

Rail
Nearest Railway station is Davanagere at 34 km from Karekatte.

Station Name : DAVANGERE

Station Code : DVG

State Highway: 76

Elevation    : 598 m above sea level

Railway Zone : South Western Railway zone.

Air
Nearest Airport is under construction at Sogane, 6 km from Shimoga  at a distance of 75 km from karekatte.

Operating Nearest Airport is Hubli Airport, 184 km from karekatte.

Hubli Airport codes: IATA: HBX, ICAO: VAHB

Civic administration 
Karekatte Gram panchayat are local governments at the village. Members of the Gram Panchayat or Gram Nyayalaya are elected directly by the village people on the basis of adult franchise by the Gram sabha which comprises the adult mass of the village, for a term of five years. A candidate contesting in this election must be 21 years old. The number of members elected is 14. Some of the seats are reserved for Scheduled Castes, Scheduled Tribes and women. A person is eligible for election if she/he does not have more than 2 children.

Gram panchyat has 5 wards, 14 elected members (including President and Vice President) and includes Hallimallapura (village attached to Karekatte).

Gram panchyat Office bearers: Panchayat Development Officer(PDO), Secretary, Data Entry Operator, Pump Operators and Peon.

The Gram panchayat has the responsibilities of

1. Looking after street lights, construction and repair work of the roads in the villages and also the village markets, fairs, festivals and celebrations.

2. Keeping a record of births, deaths and marriages in the village.

3. Looking after public health and hygiene by providing facilities for sanitation and drinking  water.

4. Providing for education.

5. Implementing development schemes for agriculture and animal husbandry.

Karekatte belongs to Channagiri Assembly Constituency, State Code: S10, Assembly Constituency Code: 109, This constituency is famous for humorous and witty thinker, the former chief minister of Karnataka late J. H. Patel.

State Elections 1999 become famous as Chief Minister J. H. Patel, lost to Vadnal Rajanna, a Bharatiya Janata Party (BJP) rebel candidate, by a margin of almost 26514 votes.

Languages spoken
Kannada, Urdu, Lambani are the major languages spoken in Karekatte.

Climate
Karekatte receives normal annual rainfall 644 mm mainly through southwest monsoon
(June–September- 341 mm) and north-East monsoon (October–December 303mm). The relative humidity is high is monsoon reason 70 to 80 but is not summer comes down to 25% to 35% temperature varies over a wide range from 18 °C to 38 °C.

Events
Basaveshwara Jatre (fair) that is conducted yearly in the month of March/April. and Mari Habba is conducted once in a 4 years.

References 

Villages in Davanagere district